Luís Filipe Veiga Dias (born 8 May 1981) is a Portuguese former professional footballer who played mainly as a right back.

Club career
Born in Lisbon, Dias spent four years with local and national giants Sporting CP (youth teams included), but could never appear for more than the reserves as a senior. He first competed in the second division at the age of already 25, with neighbours C.D. Olivais e Moscavide, playing 15 games as the team was immediately relegated to the third tier.

In the following years, Dias played in Bulgaria – only a couple of months, after which he returned to his previous club – and Romania, spending the 2009–10 season with FC Gloria Buzău in Liga II. In summer 2010 he returned to his country and joined another side from the capital, Atlético Clube de Portugal, appearing in all 30 matches in his first year as they were promoted to division two after an absence of several decades.

External links

1981 births
Living people
Footballers from Lisbon
Portuguese footballers
Association football defenders
Liga Portugal 2 players
Segunda Divisão players
Sporting CP B players
C.F. União de Lamas players
C.D. Olivais e Moscavide players
Atlético Clube de Portugal players
C.D. Cova da Piedade players
First Professional Football League (Bulgaria) players
OFC Vihren Sandanski players
Liga I players
Liga II players
FC Gloria Buzău players
Portuguese expatriate footballers
Expatriate footballers in Bulgaria
Expatriate footballers in Romania
Portuguese expatriate sportspeople in Bulgaria
Portuguese expatriate sportspeople in Romania